Structural risk minimization (SRM) is an inductive principle of use in machine learning. Commonly in machine learning, a generalized model must be selected from a finite data set, with the consequent problem of overfitting – the model becoming too strongly tailored to the particularities of the training set and generalizing poorly to new data. The SRM principle addresses this problem by balancing the model's complexity against its success at fitting the training data. This principle was first set out in a 1974 paper by Vladimir Vapnik and Alexey Chervonenkis and uses the VC dimension.

Minimizing  in effect limits the capacity of the accessible subsets of the parameter space, thereby controlling the trade-off between minimizing the training error and minimizing the expected gap between the training error and test error.

The SRM problem can be formulated in terms of data. Given n data points consisting of data x and labels y, the objective  is often expressed in the following manner:

The first term is the mean squared error (MSE) term between the value of the learned model, and the given labels . This term is the training error, that was discussed earlier. The second term, places a prior over the weights, to favor sparsity and penalize larger weights. The trade-off coefficient, is a hyperparameter that places more or less importance on the regularization term. Larger  encourages sparser weights at the expense of a more optimal MSE, and smaller  relaxes regularization allowing the model to fit to data.

See also   
 Vapnik–Chervonenkis theory
 Support vector machines
 Model selection
 Occam Learning
Empirical risk minimization

References

External links
 Structural risk minimization at the support vector machines website.

Machine learning